Hatice Akbaş (born January 1, 2002) is a Turkish female boxer competing in the bantamweight (54 kg) division.

Boxing career
On 20 May 2022, Akbaş won the gold medal in the 54 kg category at the Women's World Championship defeating Romania's Lăcrămioara Perijoc in the bantamweight final in Istanbul, Turkey.

References

External links 

2002 births
Living people
Sportspeople from Ankara
Turkish women boxers
Bantamweight boxers
AIBA Women's World Boxing Championships medalists
Competitors at the 2022 Mediterranean Games
21st-century Turkish sportswomen
Mediterranean Games gold medalists for Turkey
Mediterranean Games medalists in boxing